Emre İşçiler (born 28 September 1989 in Manisa, Turkey) is a Turkish professional footballer who currently plays as an attacking midfielder or winger for Cizrespor.

Career
İşçiler became a fan favorite with his assists and his goals for Balkes fans.

He started his professional career with Manisaspor and he also played for İzmirspor with two years loan contract.

His contract will end on 31 May 2012 by his profile in Turkey Football Federation.

References

External links
TFF.org profile

1989 births
Living people
Sportspeople from Manisa
Turkish footballers
Manisaspor footballers
Balıkesirspor footballers
Association football midfielders